.design is a generic top-level domain name in the Domain Name System of the Internet. It was proposed in ICANN's new generic top-level domain (gTLD) program, and became available to the general public on May 12, 2015. Top Level Design was the domain name registry for the string until April 2021, when it was transferred to GoDaddy Registry.

History
In September 2014, Portland, Oregon-based Top Level Design (TLD) won the right to operate the .design top-level domain after beating out six other applicants in a private auction. According to TLD's CEO Ray King, winning the auction was "very important" and one of the company's top priorities, evidenced by its name. He told Domain Name Wire, "Think of all the things that require design. Design permeates all aspects of culture." .design domain registrations became available to the general public on May 12, 2015. According to The Domains, more than 5,200 .design domains were registered on the first day of general availability.

CentralNic provides backend services through an exclusive distribution agreement and shares in the global revenues from .design domain names. Ben Crawford, CentralNic's CEO, said of the top-level domain, "It has impressive commercial potential, and it will be adopted more quickly than many other TLDs as it caters, among many other groups, to one of the best-informed professions on new Internet developments – website designers".

Ahead of .design's launch, King said of the gTLD:

See also

 List of Internet top-level domains
 .wiki, another top-level domain operated by Top Level Design

References

Computer-related introductions in 2015
design
Design
Internet properties established in 2015
GoDaddy